Maxacteon milleri is a species of small sea snail, a predatory marine gastropod mollusc in the family Acteonidae, the barrel bubble snails.

Distribution
This marine species is endemic to New Zealand

References

 The Sea Slug Forum : Maxacteon milleri
  Spencer H.G., Willan R.C., Marshall B.A. & Murray T.J. (2011). Checklist of the Recent Mollusca Recorded from the New Zealand Exclusive Economic Zone

Acteonidae
Gastropods of New Zealand
Gastropods described in 1971